Kevin J. Kelley is an American lawyer and politician in Cleveland, Ohio who served as the President of Cleveland City Council from 2014 to 2022. In Council, he represented Ward 13 (Cleveland's Old Brooklyn neighborhood) from 2005 to 2022.

Biography
Born in Cleveland to Catholic Irish American parents, Kelley earned his BA from Marquette University, a master's degree in social work from Case Western Reserve University, and a JD degree Magna Cum Laude from Cleveland State University Cleveland–Marshall College of Law. He met his wife while working for the Jesuit Volunteer Corps. 

On April 8, 2021, Kelley announced his candidacy for Mayor of Cleveland in the 2021 Cleveland mayoral election. On September 14, 2021 Kelley came second in the mayoral primary, advancing him to the general election alongside nonprofit executive Justin Bibb. Kelley lost to Bibb with 37% of the vote in the November 2 general election.

Electoral history

References

External links
 Kevin Kelley for Mayor of Cleveland

21st-century American politicians
American people of Irish descent
Candidates in the 2021 United States elections
Cleveland City Council members
Living people
Ohio Democrats
Year of birth missing (living people)